Tari L. Phillips (born March 6, 1969) is an American professional women's basketball player.  She currently plays with Acer ERG Priolo, an Italian A1 team based in Priolo Gargallo, Sicily. Her cousin Tayyiba Haneef-Park plays for USA Volleyball.

Born in Orlando, Florida, Phillips attended the University of Georgia during her first three college years, and helped its Lady Bulldogs team to the NCAA Regional Finals in 1987 and 1988.  She transferred during her senior year to the University of Central Florida, where she graduated in 1991.

She played for the Seattle Reign and the Colorado Xplosion in the American Basketball League (1996-1998). She made the ABL's Western Conference All-Star team in both 1997 and 1998, and was named the MVP of the 1997 All-Star Game.

After the ABL abruptly folded, Phillip was selected by her hometown team, the Orlando Miracle in the first round (eighth overall) of the WNBA Draft on May 4, 1999.

After her WNBA rookie season in 1999, she was selected by the Portland Fire in the WNBA's Expansion Draft in December 1999, but she was later traded to the New York Liberty just prior to the start of the WNBA's 2000 season.  She played with the Liberty from 2000 to 2004.  After the 2004 season ended, she became an unrestricted free agent and signed with the Houston Comets for the 2005 WNBA season. The Comets waived Phillips on July 2, 2007.

Phillips won a Gold Medal with USA Basketball during the Basketball World Championship in 2002. She was named to the team as a replacement for the injured Tina Thompson.

USA Basketball

Phillips was named to the USA team for the 1993 World University Games competition in Buffalo, New York. The team had a 6–2 record and won the bronze medal. Phillips was the leading scorer in several games including 25 points against Japan and 23 against China. Phillips was the overall leading scorer for the team, averaging 18.8 points per game and led the team in rebounding with 11.0 per game.

Phillips was selected to represent the US at the 1995 USA Women's Pan American Games, however, only four teams committed to participate, so the event was cancelled.

In 2002, Phillips was named to the national team which competed in the World Championships in Zhangjiagang, Changzhou and Nanjing, China. The team was coached by Van Chancellor. Phillips scored 3.3 points per game. The USA team won all nine games, including a close title game against Russia, which was a one-point game late in the game.

References

External links 
WNBA Profile
Article on joining the Houston Comets
Team roster for Acer ERG Priolo
Houston Comets Sign Guard Tamecka Dixon, Waive Tamara Moore and Tari Phillips

1969 births
Living people
American expatriate basketball people in Italy
American women's basketball players
Basketball players from Orlando, Florida
College women's basketball players in the United States
Colorado Xplosion players
Georgia Lady Bulldogs basketball players
Houston Comets players
New York Liberty players
Power forwards (basketball)
Seattle Reign (basketball) players
University of Central Florida alumni
Orlando Miracle players
Women's National Basketball Association All-Stars
Universiade bronze medalists for the United States
Universiade medalists in basketball
Medalists at the 1993 Summer Universiade
United States women's national basketball team players